Bashīr ibn Saʿd was one of the companions of Muhammad. He was a member of the Banu Khazraj and later became its leader. He was the first one who pledged of allegiance to the first caliph, Abu Bakr, in a meeting in Saqifa. He wisely handled the situation when there was a huge dispute and division on the matter of succession to Prophet.

Biography

Early life
He was among the early Muslims of Medina from the clan of Banu Khazraj. When he reached in his mature age he became the chief of Banu Khazraj

610 – 632: Muhammad's era
He was a Companion who was present at the battle of Badr.

He became the chief of Banu Aus

Military campaigns during Muhammad's era

He participated in the Battle of Badr. Muhammad's forces included Abu Bakr, Umar, Ali, Hamza, Mus`ab ibn `Umair, Az-Zubair bin Al-'Awwam, Ammar ibn Yasir, and Abu Dharr al-Ghifari. The Muslims also brought seventy camels and two horses, meaning that they either had to walk or fit three to four men per camel. However, many early Muslim sources indicate that no serious fighting was expected, and the future Caliph Uthman stayed behind to care for his sick wife Ruqayyah, the daughter of Muhammad. Salman the Persian also could not join the battle, as he was still not a free man.

He also led a military campaign as a commander known as the Expedition of Bashir Ibn Sa’d al-Ansari (Fadak). He was sent to Fadak, the event took place in Shaban, 7AH i.e. December 628 AD,3rd Month 7AH, of the Islamic Calendar.

Succession to Muhammad

It is mentioned in Seerat Ibn e Ishaq (the first biography of Muhammad)) and subsequently Seerat Ibn e Hatham (another authentic biography of Muhammad)) and all other history and biography books that when Muhammad died, companions of Prophet were busy in their final rituals then they were informed that there is a gathering of Ansar of Medina. They are discussing succession after Prophet, and Sa'd ibn Ubadah chief of Khazraj clan is a strong candidate for succession of leadership. Fearing of civil war Abu Bakr, Umar and Abu Ubaidah ibn al-Jarrah instantly reached there, the situation was quite tense. Ansars were almost agreed on the khilafat of Sa'd ibn Ubadah, Muhajirs mainly above three shaikhs disagreed then Habab ibn Mundhir who was motivating the Ansars to take control of the city, suggested to appoint to two Khalifas, one from Ansars and other for Muhajirs and if Muhajirs don't agree on that term then "take your swords and throw them out of Medina". Then Bashir ibn Sa'ad who belonged to clan of Banu Aws, intervened and handled the flared up situation. He said, "O Ansar you're the first who helped Prophet when His own people rejected him, now you should not be the first to destroy unity of Muslims after Him. And whatever you'he done for Islam you should seek its reward in afterlife and should not be divided on the issue of succession."
After that Abu Bakr asked people to appoint as Khalifa either to Umar or Abu Ubaidah ibn al-Jarrah because both of them were Muhajirs from Quraysh, were among the very first who accepted Islam and were among the closest companions of Prophet. But Umar withdrew himself saying that he would never consider himself when Abu Bakr is present. Then Bashir ibn Sa'ad was the first one who pledged at the hand of Abu Bakr, then Umar and Abu Ubaidah ibn al-Jarrah and after that all people at Saqifah followed them.

Death

He was martyred at 'Ayn at-Tamr, as az-Zurqani mentioned.

Legacy

Shi'a view
 states:

See also
Islam
Maarrat al-Nu'man
List of expeditions of Muhammad

References

External links
http://www.bogvaerker.dk/Bookwright/rijal.html

633 deaths
Year of birth unknown
Sahabah who participated in the battle of Uhud
Sahabah who participated in the battle of Badr